Etimoni Timuani (born 14 October 1991 in Funafuti) is a Tuvaluan sportsman. He is a footballer and sprinter specializing in the 100 m distance. Timuani is a father-of-two from Funafuti who works for the Tuvalu National Provident Fund, the national pension scheme.

Club career
Timuani played in 2011 for Lakena United. In 2012, he played for Tofaga. In 2014, he played for Manu Laeva. Timuani was the top goalscorer in the NBT Cup for B teams in 2012, with 8 goals.

The 2013 Tuvalu Games football champions were Tofaga. They won the final against Nauti 1–0, with him scoring the only goal.

International career

Futsal
Timuani played in May 2011 with Tuvalu national futsal team at the Oceanian Futsal Championship. He played all four games.

Football
He made his debut for the Tuvalu national football team in the game against Samoa on 22 August 2011. He played five games for the Tuvalu national football team at the 2011 Pacific Games as a defender:  against American Samoa, Vanuatu, New Caledonia, Solomon Islands, and Guam.

Athletics

Reme represented Tuvalu in Athletics at the 2015 Pacific Games in Papua New Guinea. He was however disqualified in the 100 m heats due to a false start. He competed in the Men's 100 metres event at the 2015 World Championships in Athletics in Beijing, China with a time of 11.72 seconds in the preliminary heat. He qualified for the 2016 Rio Olympics in the 100 m event. He was the only Tuvaluan to represent Tuvalu in the Rio Olympics. He achieved a time of 11.81 seconds in the preliminary heat. He did not advance to the next round.

Honours
NBT Cup for B teams Top Scorer: 2012

See also
Tuvalu at the 2015 World Championships in Athletics
Tuvalu at the 2016 Summer Olympics

References

External links
 

1991 births
Association football defenders
F.C. Tofaga players
Living people
People from Funafuti
Tuvalu international footballers
Tuvaluan footballers
Tuvaluan male sprinters
World Athletics Championships athletes for Tuvalu
Athletes (track and field) at the 2016 Summer Olympics
Olympic athletes of Tuvalu
Lakena United players